Iain Malone Luke (born 8 October 1951, Dundee) is a former Labour Party politician in Scotland. He was the Member of Parliament (MP) for Dundee East from 2001 until being unseated at the 2005 general election by Stewart Hosie of the Scottish National Party (SNP).

Biography
Iain Luke was educated at Stobswell Boys' Junior Secondary School and the Harris Academy (then a grammar school) in Dundee. He attended the University of Dundee, gaining an MA in Political Science and Modern History in 1980, and the University of Edinburgh, where he gained a postgraduate diploma in Business Administration in 1981.

From 1969–1974, he was an assistant collector of taxes in Dundee and London. From 1974–75, he was an assistant sales manager for Brown & Tawse, steel stockholders, in Dundee.

From 1982–1986, he was a part-time lecturer in General Studies at Angus Further Education College (now Angus College) in Arbroath. He had previously been leader of Dundee City Council, being on the council from 1996–2001. He was a member of Dundee District Council from 1984–1996. He was a senior lecturer at Dundee College in public administration, housing and European Studies. He is an undergraduate tutor in the Politics Department of the University of Dundee.

Parliamentary career
At the 2001 general election, he was elected as Member of Parliament for Dundee East, but lost his seat to Stewart Hosie of the Scottish National Party in the 2005 general election. In the 2007 Scottish Parliament election, he stood for election in the constituency of the same name, but was defeated by Stewart Hosie's wife, and incumbent MSP, Shona Robison.

Personal life
He is married to wife Marie, and they have a son and two daughters.

References

External links 
 
 They work for you
 Ask Aristotle
 Biography

1951 births
Living people
Members of the Parliament of the United Kingdom for Dundee constituencies
Scottish Labour MPs
UK MPs 2001–2005
Politicians from Dundee
Alumni of the University of Edinburgh
Alumni of the University of Dundee
People educated at Harris Academy
Councillors in Dundee
Scottish Labour councillors